The 2002 Norwich City Council election took place on 2 May 2002 to elect members of Norwich City Council in England. This was on the same day as other local elections. 16 of 48 seats (one-third) were up for election, with an additional seat up in Henderson ward due to a by-election.

Results summary

Ward results

Bowthorpe

Catton Grove

Coslany

Crome

Eaton

Heigham

Henderson

Lakenham

Mancroft

Mile Cross

Mousehold

Nelson

St. Stephen

Thorpe Hamlet

Town Close

University

References

2002 English local elections
2002
2000s in Norfolk
May 2002 events in the United Kingdom